Almurta was a railway station on the Wonthaggi railway line, located on the Bass Coast in Victoria. It operated from the opening of the Wonthaggi line in 1910, until the line closed in 1978. It was originally announced that the station would be called "Rees", but that name never seems to have been applied.  

The retaining wall of the former platform is in poor condition, but a nearby trestle bridge is still intact.

References

Disused railway stations in Victoria (Australia)
Transport in Gippsland (region)
Bass Coast Shire